This article describes the contract bridge bidding convention.

Devised by Kit Woolsey, the convention is a defense against an opponent's one notrump opening; especially used at matchpoints.  Initial bids are as follows:

The convention has similarities with Multi-Landy.

Abuses
Common abuses as described by Kit Woolsey include:

 3-1-4-5 distributional hands in the balancing seat regularly  double, even with no 4-card major suit.
 Strong hands, with 19 high card points plus, start with a double and then rebid 2 Notrump (or double) to try to expose a psychic bid.
 Good 4-4-4-1 distributional hands with a stiff minor suit can start with 2.
 Single-suited minor hands often start with double, hoping to be able to play at the two-level. These hands will pass a 2 asking bid.

See also
 List of defenses to 1NT

References

External links
 Multi-Landy (Woolsey) Defense to 1 Notrump Openings on Bridgebum.com

Bridge conventions